Scottsburg is a hamlet and census-designated place (CDP) in Livingston County, New York, United States. Its population was 117 as of the 2010 census. New York State Route 256 passes through the community.

Geography
Scottsburg is in southern Livingston County, mainly in the northern part of the town of Sparta. A small portion of the CDP extends west into the town of Groveland. State Route 256 leads south  to Dansville and north  to Lakeville. Geneseo, the Livingston county seat, is 12 miles northwest of Scottsburg.

It sits in the valley of Conesus Inlet, which flows north  to Conesus Lake, the westernmost of the Finger Lakes.

Demographics

Points of interest
 The gravesite of Daniel Shays is in Union Cemetery.

References

Hamlets in Livingston County, New York
Hamlets in New York (state)
Census-designated places in Livingston County, New York
Census-designated places in New York (state)